Tekle Hailemikael is an Ethiopian former cyclist. He competed in the individual road race at the 1992 Summer Olympics.

References

Year of birth missing (living people)
Living people
Ethiopian male cyclists
Olympic cyclists of Ethiopia
Cyclists at the 1992 Summer Olympics
Place of birth missing (living people)